Munditia owengaensis is a minute sea snail, a marine gastropod mollusc in the family Liotiidae.

Distribution
This marine species is endemic to New Zealand and occurs at the Chatham Islands, New Zealand.

References

 Powell A. W. B., New Zealand Mollusca, William Collins Publishers Ltd, Auckland, New Zealand 1979 

owengaensis
Gastropods of New Zealand
Gastropods described in 1933